Avatha mixosema is a species of moth of the family Erebidae. It is found on Sumatra.

References

Moths described in 1928
Avatha
Moths of Indonesia